KLBE-LP (100.7 FM, "Club Radio") is a low-power FM Christian radio station located in Bismarck, North Dakota. The station is owned by the New Song Church located in the northern section of the city. Local teens that are members of the church serve as DJs for the station, and can play any music that is in the station's music library. Much of the music on Club Radio is an eclectic blend of contemporary Christian music, Christian rock, post-hardcore, hip hop, and electronica.

External links
Club Radio 100.7 FM official website
Club Radio on MySpace
 

LBE-LP
LBE-LP
Contemporary Christian radio stations in the United States
Freeform radio stations
Radio stations established in 2005
LBE-LP